The Nineteenth Wisconsin Legislature convened from January 10, 1866, to April 12, 1866, in regular session.

Senators representing even-numbered districts were newly elected for this session and were serving the first year of a two-year term. Assembly members were elected to a one-year term. Assembly members and even-numbered senators were elected in the general election of November 7, 1865.  Senators representing odd-numbered districts were serving the second year of their two-year term, having been elected in the general election held on November 8, 1864.

Major events
 January 1, 1866: Inauguration of Lucius Fairchild as the 10th Governor of Wisconsin.
 April 9, 1866: Congress overrode the veto of President Andrew Johnson to pass the Civil Rights Act of 1866.
 July 24, 1866: Tennessee became the first state readmitted to the Union after the American Civil War.
 August 23, 1866: The Treaty of Prague ended the Austro-Prussian War, establishing Prussian hegemony over the German states of central Europe.
 October 12, 1866: The Treaty of Vienna ended the Third Italian War of Independence, with the Austrian Empire conceding the region of Venetia.

Major legislation
 April 21, 1866: Act to apportion the state into Senate and Assembly districts, 1866 Act 101

Party summary

Senate summary

Assembly summary

Sessions
 1st Regular session: January 10, 1866April 12, 1866

Leaders

Senate leadership
 President of the Senate: Wyman Spooner
 President pro tempore: Willard H. Chandler

Assembly leadership
 Speaker of the Assembly: Henry D. Barron

Members

Members of the Senate
Members of the Wisconsin Senate for the Nineteenth Wisconsin Legislature:

Members of the Assembly
Members of the Assembly for the Nineteenth Wisconsin Legislature:

References

1866 in Wisconsin
Wisconsin
Wisconsin legislative sessions